The Women's Allam British Open 2013 is the women's edition of the 2013 British Open Squash Championships, which is a WSA World Series event Platinum (Prize money: $95 000). The event took place at the KC Stadium in Hull in England from 20 May to 26 May. Laura Massaro won her first British Open trophy, beating Nicol David in the final.

Prize money and ranking points
For 2013, the prize purse was $95,000. The prize money and points breakdown is as follows:

Seeds

Draw and results

See also
WSA World Series 2013
2013 Men's British Open

References

External links
WISPA British Open 2013 website
British Open 2013 official website

Women's British Open Squash Championships
Women's British Open
Women's British Open Squash Championship
Squash in England
Sport in Kingston upon Hull
2010s in Kingston upon Hull
2013 in women's squash